Zach Erdem (born July 17, 1982 in Erzincan, Turkey) is a television personality and entrepreneur. He is an owner and partner in several Long Island-based restaurants and nightclubs including 75 Main in Southampton, New York. Zach and his staff appear on American reality television show Serving the Hamptons which premiered April 7, 2022 on Discovery+. The reality TV show features employees and patrons from his eateries and nightlife venues.

References 

American television personalities
Male television personalities
American businesspeople
American people of Turkish descent
1982 births
Living people